Giuseppina is a 1960 short British documentary film produced by James Hill, which was filmed in 1959, in Mandriole, Emilia-Romagna, near Ravenna in the north east of Italy. It won the Academy Award for Best Documentary (Short Subject). Production of the film was sponsored by the British Petroleum company (BP), which also distributed the film. The BP webpage summarizes the film as, "set at an Italian petrol station where various characters pass through on their onward journey, while entertaining and playing with the attendant's daughter, Giuseppina."

In the 1960s and early 1970s, Giuseppina was broadcast 185 times on British television as a trade test colour film. Excerpts were also shown on Vision On, the BBC programme for deaf and hard-of-hearing children. It was released as an extra on the BFI Flipside DVD release of "Lunch Hour".

Cast
 Antonia Scalari as Giuseppina
 Giulio Marchetti as Rossi

References

External links
Watch Giuseppina at BP Video Library

1960 films
1960 documentary films
1960 short films
BP
1960s short documentary films
British short documentary films
Best Documentary Short Subject Academy Award winners
Sponsored films
Films directed by James Hill (British director)
Films scored by Jack Beaver
Films set in Italy
Documentary films about road transport
1960s English-language films
1960s British films